Flaherty Island is the largest island of the Belcher Islands group in Hudson Bay in Qikiqtaaluk Region, Nunavut, Canada.

The Inuit community of Sanikiluaq is located on its north coast. Sanikiluaq is the southernmost community in Nunavut.

The island is named in honour of visual anthropologist Robert J. Flaherty.

References

External links 
 Flaherty Island in the Atlas of Canada - Toporama; Natural Resources Canada

Belcher Islands
Islands of Hudson Bay
Inhabited islands of Qikiqtaaluk Region